Clonkeen College is a Christian Brothers secondary school for boys in south Dublin, which opened in 1970. Clonkeen College has approximately 550 students and 35 teaching staff. Edward Melly is the principal and Michael Brennan is the Deputy Principal. The school has strong links with charities and the developing world. Clonkeen underwent significant development between the years 2015 – 2018.

History
The Ordnance Survey Ireland map 1837–1842 shows Clonkeen School Ho[use], located in the present day Cornelscourt Village. Although the same building appears on the OSI 1888–1913 map, it is not named as a school any more.

The original junior school was St. Joseph's Private Preparatory School, built in September 1965 close to where the present Clonkeen College stands. It was run by a staff of three Christian Brothers until the school was closed in 1975. The secondary school was also called St. Joseph's, until renamed Clonkeen College.

The present school stands on the site of Charles Stewart Parnell’s second last public meeting. The first pupils to the current school were admitted in the autumn of 1970, there was one fifth year and two third year classes (there was no fourth year then). Thirteen students completed the first Leaving Certificate. The school principal was Br. Jo Hogan; other original teachers were Br. Collins and Mr. B. Toomey. The school was officially opened by David Andrews TD on 31 January 1972.

Facilities
Three full-sized Gaelic football pitches and one training pitch, used for gaelic football, hurling and soccer
One indoor basketball court (in the gymnasium)
Four science labs
A hall that acts as an auditorium for theatrical productions
A sports hall
A functioning gym
An art room
2 computer rooms
Special needs unit

Subjects offered

Junior cycle subjects
Irish
English
Mathematics
French
Geography
History
Science
Business studies
Art
Civic, social and political education
Religious education
Physical education
Music

Senior cycle subjects
Irish
English
Mathematics
French
Geography
History
Physics
Chemistry
Biology
Business
Economics
Accounting
Art
Religious education
Physical education
Music
Design communication graphics
Classical studies – extracurricular
Applied mathematics – extracurricular
LCVP – extracurricular

Transition year (TY)
The year's main outing is a tour organised by the TY co-ordinator. Classes have visited Greece, the Aran Islands, Paris, Venice, Madrid, Barcelona, Amsterdam and Lake Garda.

During the year the students have the opportunity to do courses such as: Self-defense, ECDL, Gaelic football, FAI coaching, and Sailing.  New subjects in the transition year are cooking, music, effective communication, German, Japanese and technical drawing. The students have an opportunity to attain a Gaisce\Presidents Award.

Students visit educational and historical sites like Christchurch, St Patrick's Cathedral, Dublin, and Glendalough, Croke Park, Kilmainham Gaol and the National Art Gallery.

Every few years, the opportunity arrises for Transition Years to do a musical. The most recent musical was conducted showing of Buggsy Malone in 2018.

Clonkeen student council
Students have input into the schools running in the form of a student council of class representatives from all years, who are elected by their peers.

Since its inception, the Clonkeen College Student Council has shown a large involvement in the running of the school.  The council meets weekly to discuss projects or issues. The council is composed of twenty four prefects. Prefects carry out a variety of tasks and act as the link between the students and the management of the school.

Each year the council focuses on one major project.  In the past they have had water fountains installed in the junior and senior corridors; more recently they had formal shoes and school jackets introduced to the uniform.  Annually, the council, in conjunction with the Parents Council and the Cluny Student Council, organise a "Ball in the Hall" to welcome Clonkeen's new first year students.  Council meetings are chaired by the chairman and the Secretary takes minutes.

A Councillor's term of office runs from December of their election to December of the following year. The only exception is with the 1st year representatives who will be allowed until Halloween to settle into the secondary school life.

Social events
The First Year Social, or "Ball in the Hall", is a disco for the first year students of Clonkeen College and St. Joseph of Cluny, Killiney girls' school.  The Social Committee contact and work with the Cluny Student Council and jointly organise and run the ball, liaising with the principals and Parents Councils.

Every September, past pupils and friends of the school are invited to a "Golf Day" (and night).

Sports

Inter-school sports
Athletics (track and field)
The school participates in Christian Brother and east Leinster athletics competitions.
Cross country running
Clonkeen enters runners in the under-15 and under-17 east Leinster cross country running competitions.
Gaelic football
The school enters gaelic football teams into 1st year, under-14, under-16 and under-18 competitions.  They have won three Dublin titles in 1975, 1976 and 2003, the under14 team also came runner up in the Leinster championship of 2003.
Golf
1st, 2nd and 3rd year students take part in the Dublin junior match play golf competition.
Hurling
The hurlers play in 1st year, under-14, under-16 and under-18 hurling competitions.
Soccer
The school has soccer teams entered into competitions at under-14, under-16 and under-18 level. Leinster Junior Champions, runner up to All-Ireland in 1981–1982
Chess
The first Clonkeen College chess team was formed in 2007 and took part in the Scholastic Chess All-Ireland.
International Rules Football
In 2006 Clonkeen hosted Southern Cross college and the two schools competed in a friendly international rules football match, which Clonkeen won.

Club sports
Basketball
Canoeing
Chess
Orienteering
Rugby union
Sailing
Swimming
Tennis
Volleyball
Water polo

Extracurricular activities
Public Speaking
The school's public speaking team have participated in the Mental Health Public Speaking Competition.
Drama
Clonkeen has long had the tradition of performing annual Christmas pantomimes, such as Jack and the Beanstalk in late 2007, but have recently begun performing musicals as well, with Footloose (musical) having been seen there in the Spring of 2012, and Disco Inferno (musical) the following year, 2013.
Annual adventure holidays
Every year students are accompanied by several teachers on an outdoor pursuits week in the Ardèche region in Southern France.
BT Young Scientist and Technology Exhibition
The school enters Irelands Young Scientist and Technology Exhibition and won the competition in 1992.
Other activities
The school offers students music classes, hosts quizzes for both students and adults connected to the school, internal leagues provide sporting opportunities to students who may miss the chance to play for a school team.  The school has an annual sports day open to entry from all the students.

Notable alumni
 Stephen Byrne – (RTÉ) presenter 
 Oisin Gough – Dublin Hurler
 Alan Judge – professional footballer
 Jason Knight - professional footballer for Derby County F.C and Ireland national team
 Tommy Lyons – former Dublin football manager 
 Colum McCann – international writer and novelist 
 Kevin Nolan – Dublin Gaelic Footballer
 Darren O'Dea – professional footballer
 Glenn Quinn – television and film actor (deceased)
 David Treacy – Dublin Hurler
 Prof. Philip Nolan - Director General of Science Foundation Ireland, former NPHET chair, former president of Maynooth University, former deputy president of University College Dublin.

References

External links
Clonkeen College website

Boys' schools in the Republic of Ireland
Educational institutions established in 1965
Secondary schools in Dún Laoghaire–Rathdown
Congregation of Christian Brothers secondary schools in the Republic of Ireland
1965 establishments in Ireland